The River Moy is a river in the northwest of Ireland.

Name

Ptolemy's Geography (2nd century AD) described a river called Λιβνιου (Libniu, perhaps from *lei- "flow") which probably referred to the River Moy.

The Moy is first named in Adomnán's Life of Columba (c. 700) as Modam fluvium. Later spellings include Muaide, Muadam, Múed, Múaid; the name An Mhuaidh is used in modern Irish. The name is possibly derived from the Old Irish word muad, meaning "noble."

Geography 
The Moy rises at the foot of the  Ox Mountains in County Sligo. For the greater part of its length, it flows southwestward, entering County Mayo and passing near Swinford before passing through Foxford then turning north near the village of Kilmore and heading for the town of Ballina, where it enters the Atlantic Ocean at Killala Bay.
The catchment area of the River Moy is 2,086 km2.
The long term average flow rate of the River Moy into Killala Bay is 61.5 cubic metres per second (m3/s)

The Moy valley, with its ancient churches and abbeys, is a prominent tourist destination.

The entrance to the River Moy from an 1860 chart, showing turbulent water over the bar.

Economics 
The river was once among the best salmon fisheries in Europe; however, in recent times, drift net fishing off the coast caused a huge decline in salmon numbers. According to central fisheries board statistics, 101,231 returning salmon were taken by drift nets off the west coast of Ireland in 2005. In the same year, 29% (6,675) of all rod-caught salmon in Ireland were taken in the Ballina district as a result of a weir which keeps salmon trapped in the ridge pool near the mouth of the river during the summer. Drift netting for salmon was banned in November 2006 and the ban came into force on 1 January 2007.

References

https://web.archive.org/web/20160303222354/http://www.serbd.com/MultiDownloads/Creport/Chapters/Physical%20Description%20Ch3.pdf R.O.I. Rivers Table 3.10 P.38

External links

 http://www.themoy.com daily updates on Fishing conditions and Catches
 Salmon fishing on the River Moy, from Salmon Ireland
 The Moy Fishery
 Report of the Independent Salmon Group

Moy
Moy